Boggywell Creek, an urban gully that is part of the Georges River catchment, is located in the southern Sydney district of St George, in New South Wales, Australia.

Course and features

See also 

 Rivers of New South Wales

References 

Creeks and canals of Sydney
Georges River Council